François Naoueyama (born 31 January 1957) is a basketball player from the Central African Republic. He competed at the 1988 Summer Olympics with the Central African Republic national basketball team. He scored 47 points in the team's 7 games.

References

1957 births
Living people
Central African Republic men's basketball players
Olympic basketball players of the Central African Republic
Basketball players at the 1988 Summer Olympics